Highland Distillers was founded in 1887 by the Robertson family. In 1970 Highland purchased Matthew Gloag & Son, producers of the Famous Grouse blended whisky and acquired The Macallan single malt Scotch producers in Speyside, in 1996. Highland also produced the Highland Park brand whisky. Highland Distillers was purchased by the Edrington Group in 1999. William Grant & Sons and the Edrington Group took Highland Distillers private in 2000.

References

Further reading

External links
 The Edrington Group Ltd. website

British companies established in 1887
1887 establishments in Scotland
William Grant & Sons